Vincent Collins (23 September 1917 – 30 October 1989) was an Australian cricketer. He played two first-class matches for New South Wales between 1941/42 and 1947/48.

See also
 List of New South Wales representative cricketers

References

External links
 

1917 births
1989 deaths
Australian cricketers
New South Wales cricketers
Cricketers from Sydney